Anthela exoleta is a moth of the family Anthelidae first described by Charles Swinhoe in 1892. It is found in Australia.

References

Moths described in 1892
Anthelidae